Corgi Socks is the trading name of Corgi Hosiery Limited, a manufacturer of luxury socks and knitwear in hand-knitted wool, cotton and cashmere. Its factory is located in Ammanford, Wales, UK where it currently employs around 50 people. The business is a subsidiary of Dewhurst Dent Plc, owners of Dents. It has a reputation as a manufacturer of luxury socks and its customers include the British royal family.

History of the business 
Corgi was founded in 1892. It began as a maker of socks for Welsh miners and moved on to making argyle pattern socks for Brooks Brothers in 1939. Corgi made socks for the British troops during World War II.

Over the years Corgi has gone in and out of different ownership, but has always been run by the Jones family.

It was founded by Rhys Jones and is now run by his great, great grandchildren, siblings Chris Jones and Lisa Wood, who took over from their father Huw Jones in 1997 and transitioned the business from making socks under other people's labels to growing the Corgi brand. It has been a subsidiary of Dewhurst Dent PLC since 2008.

Corgi now makes knitwear under its own brand as well as for designers like Burberry and Thom Browne.

In 2015, the business expanded with a 3,000-square feet extension and new knitting machines.

Machinery and manufacture 
Corgi uses many older machines in its manufacturing, including rare 125-year-old Griswold hand-knitting machines, and links the toes of its socks by hand using traditional methods. Knitwear is hand-framed and intricate intarsia designs can be created.

In the media 
It was reported that Queen Elizabeth II bought her socks from Corgi, and Prince George has a jumper made by the company.
To raise funds for those impacted by the Manchester Arena bombing, socks decorated with bees were made – bees being a symbol of Manchester. In 2012 the company was fined following mishandling of asbestos by contractors during renovations to the roof.

Awards 
Corgi received a Royal Warrant from the Prince of Wales (now Charles III) in 1989.

See also

List of sock manufacturers

References

1892 establishments in Wales
British companies established in 1892
British Royal Warrant holders
Clothing companies established in 1892
Companies based in Carmarthenshire
Knitwear manufacturers
Clothing companies of Wales
Socks
Hosiery brands